Hongunta  is a village in the southern state of Karnataka, India. It is located in the Chitapur taluk of Kalaburagi district in Karnataka.

Demographics
 India census, Hongunta had a population of 5141 with 2617 males and 2524 females.

See also
 Gulbarga
 Districts of Karnataka

References

External links
 http://Gulbarga.nic.in/

Villages in Kalaburagi district